Japanese football in 1951.

Emperor's Cup

National team

Results

Players statistics

Births
April 15 - Choei Sato
June 28 - Kazumi Takada
July 7 - Shigemi Ishii
July 27 - Kazuo Saito

External links

 
Seasons in Japanese football